Banani is a part of Ward No. 19 in Banani Thana, Dhaka, Bangladesh.

Geography
It has a lake called Banani Lake. Korail slum is located on the border of Banani.

History 
In November 2016 Dhaka North City Corporation demolished the home of former East Pakistan Governor Abdul Monem Khan. In 2019, 19 were killed in the FR Tower fire.

Population 
According to the 2011 Bangladesh census, the population of Banani was 24,718.

Gallery

References

Populated places in Dhaka Division
Planned cities in Bangladesh